al-Jawāb al-Ṣaḥīḥ li-man baddala dīn al-Masīḥ (The Sound Reply to Those Who Altered Christ's Religion) is a book written between 1293 and 1321 CE, by Ibn Taymiyyah. The work is a detailed refutation of Christian doctrine.

References

Sunni literature
Books by Ibn Taymiyyah
Books critical of Christianity